Ainhoa Vicente Moraza (born 20 August 1995), also known as Ainhoa Moraza, is a Spanish professional footballer who plays as a defender for Primera División club Atlético Madrid and the Spain national team.

Vicente began her career as a teenager at Añorga in Gipuzkoa, moving on to the province's main club Real Sociedad in 2012. After three years in San Sebastián she signed for Athletic Bilbao, winning the Primera División title in her first season and staying there for six more. In 2022, after appearing over 200 times for Athletic, she elected not to renew her contract (as did teammate and fellow Spanish international Lucía García) and joined Atlético Madrid.

Honours
Athletic Bilbao
 Primera División: 2015–16

References

External links
 Profile at UEFA
 

1995 births
Living people
Footballers from San Sebastián
Spanish women's footballers
Women's association football defenders
Añorga KKE players
Real Sociedad (women) players
Athletic Club Femenino players
Atlético Madrid Femenino players
Primera División (women) players
Spain women's international footballers
21st-century Spanish women